The Elwin Bay diatreme, also called the Elwin Bay kimberlite, is a small post-Silurian kimberlite diatreme located approximately  south of Elwin Bay at the eastern margin of Somerset Island, Nunavut, Canada.

See also
Volcanism in Canada
List of volcanoes in Canada

References

Diatremes of Nunavut
Paleozoic volcanism
Landforms of Qikiqtaaluk Region